Karišik (Bosnian|karǐšik) is a Bosnian surname. Karišik comes from the Turkish word "karışık" which means "mixed". Notable people with the surname include:

Eldin Karišik (born 1983), Swedish footballer
Esad Karišik, Serbian-Bosniak football manager and former player
Kenan Karisik (born 1987), Bosnian-Turkish footballer
Miloš Karišik (born 1988), Serbian footballer
Tanja Karišik-Košarac (born 1991), Bosnian cross country skier and biathlete
   Enes Karisik

See also
İlişki Durumu: Karışık, remake of Full House (Turkish TV series)

Bosnian surnames
Croatian surnames
Serbian surnames
Slavic-language surnames
Patronymic surnames